Ernest Bates (10 June 1935 – February 1995) was an English professional footballer who played as a left back for Bradford (Park Avenue).

References

1935 births
1995 deaths
Footballers from Huddersfield
English footballers
Huddersfield Town A.F.C. players
Bradford (Park Avenue) A.F.C. players
English Football League players
Association football fullbacks